Malankara Orthodox Syrian Church Medical College is a private medical college at Kolenchery near Kochi in the state of Kerala. It is a Christian minority institution established and administered by Malankara Orthodox Syrian Church (MOSC). At present MOSC is home to a Medical College, College of Nursing, Nursing School, Super Speciality Hospital, postgraduate degree courses in General Medicine, General Surgery, Paediatrics, Psychiatry, Obstetrics & Gynaecology and Anaesthesiology and Diploma courses in Anaesthesiology, Obstetrics & Gynaecology, Paediatrics & Psychiatry and DM course in Neonatology.

Location
The college is around 16 km east from Thripunithura Railway station and around 30 kilometers from Cochin International Airport.

History
MOSC was established in 1970 as a noncharitable Hospital in Kolenchery.

Achievements
 Maintained consistently high result in the first, second and final MBBS examinations with several distinctions and first classes from the time of inception.
 Secured 92% pass in the 1st MBBS examination of the Kerala University of Health Sciences in the first ever examination held by the University in September 2011. 21 distinctions and 58 first classes and 13 second classes.
 MOSC is registered for ECFMG credential verification.
 Commenced postgraduate degree courses in Radiodiognosis, General Medicine, General Surgery, Paediatrics, Psychiatry, Obstetrics & Gynaecology and Anaesthesiology and Diploma courses in Anaesthesiology, Obstetrics & Gynaecology, Paediatrics and Psychiatry and DM course in Neonatology.
 MOSC started MOSC INSTITUTE OF ALLIED HEALTH SCIENCES in November 2017,with a PG course as Master of Hospital Administration (MHA) under the affiliation of Kerala University of Health Sciences www.mosciahs.edu.in
 Secured best result in the university for MHA exams in 2018 and 2019

Departments
The hospital includes the following departments:
Cardio thoracic and vascular Surgery
 Oncology
 Cardiology
 Anaesthesiology
 Community Medicine
 Dentistry
 Dermatology
 E.N.T
 General Medicine
 General Surgery
 Obstetrics & Gyanaecology
 Ophthalmology
 Orthopaedics
 Paediatrics
 Psychiatry
 Pulmonology
 Radiodiagnosis
 Nephrology
 Maxillofacial Surgery
 Gastroenterology
 Plastic and Reconstructive Surgery
 Nuclear Medicine
 Anatomy
 Biochemistry
 Physiology
 Forensic Medicine
 Microbiology
 Pathology
 Pharmacology

Facilities
 Library
 Hostels
 Lecture Theatres
 Canteen
 Laboratories
 Health care
 Internet Facilities
 Insurance Facilities

References

External links
 Official website

Kolencherry
Christian universities and colleges in India
Medical colleges in Kochi
Hospitals in Kerala
Private medical colleges in India
Universities and colleges in Ernakulam district
2002 establishments in Kerala
Educational institutions established in 2002
Hospitals established in 2002